The Georgia national handball team is the national team of Georgia. It takes part in international team handball competitions.

Tournament record

Challenge Trophy

IHF Emerging Nations Championship
2017 – 8th place
2019 – 1st place
2021 – 1st place

Georgia vs opponent (Not friendly match)

friendly 2013 year
(2 lost Israel,) (1 lost Ukraine) 
friendly 2016 year
(2 lost Israel)

External links

IHF profile

Men's national handball teams
Handball